The Château de Bélarga is a château constructed in the 17th century located on the left bank of the Hérault River in the commune of Bélarga in the Hérault département of France. Part of the building is from an earlier castle dating from the 14th and 15th centuries.

History 
A castle was recorded in Bélarga before 1281, in a document concerning the construction of a village. An enceinte commanded by this fortress was built at the end of the 13th century or the beginning of the 14th century. The building dominated a ford over the Hérault which was subject to a toll.

The area belonged to the Guilhem family, powerful lords of Clermont-Lodève (today Clermont-l'Hérault). Berenger IV of Guilhem was described as lord of the castrum de Belesgario in 1310. His successor, Pierre de Clermont, is infamous for having committed in Bélarga a crime against the person of a young woman from Puilacher, for which he was condemned in 1310 by the sénéchal of Carcassonne; the sentence was confirmed by the Parlement de Paris on 29 January 1311 (see below). One result was the confiscation of the seigneurie of Bélarga.

In the 17th century, the castle belonged to the Mirmans, a family of the Nobles of the Robe which included numerous magistrates in the sovereign courts of Languedoc. In 1654, the knight François de Mirman, conseiller du roi and intendant des gabelles, had the titles of "baron de Florac, seigneur de Bélarga, etc.".

The Mirmans gave the building its current appearance, embellishing it "in the rustic taste fashionable in the 17th century in Montpellier".

Description 
The north wing of the present building probably dates from the 14th century, altered in the 15th. North of this, a new château was built in the 17th century.

Ownership 
The Château de Bélarga is private property, inhabited by its owners. It was the object of a study for the cultural heritage inventory by the French Ministry of Culture in 1976.

Pierre de Clermont's crime 
On 29 January 1311, the Parlement de Paris confirmed a sentence passed by the sénéchal of Carcassonne on Pierre de Clermont, seigneur de Bélarga, in these terms:

See also 
 Château des Guilhem
 List of castles in France
 Castles in Hérault

References

External links
 
 

Castles in Hérault
Monuments historiques of Hérault